Narsingh Dev Jamwal (born 1931) is an Indian writer and playwright from Jammu, who has authored 48 books, including Sanjhi Dharti Bakhle Mahnu (novel), which won the Sahitya Akademi Award in 1978. He received India's fourth highest civilian award, Padma Shri (2019) for his contribution in the field of literature and education.

Life 
He was born in 1931 in Bhalwal. Jamwal completed his matriculation in 1945. He joined the Jammu & Kashmir Police in 1953. He also holds a master's degree in Dogri from Jammu University.

In 1978, Narsingh Dev was honoured with a Sahitya Akademi Award for his novel in Dogri language, Sanjhi Dharti Bakhle Mahnu. In 2008, he was awarded the Sangeet Natak Akademi Award for his contribution to Indian theatre as a playwright.

Plays 
 Aan Maryada
 Mandlik, Pinjra
 Kaure Ghutt
 Sarkar
 Devyani
 Allad Goli Veer Sipahi
Source:

Awards and recognition 
 Padma Shri (2019)
 President's Police Medal (1986)
 Sahitya Akademi Award (1978)
 Sangeet Natak Akademi Award (2008)

See also 

 List of Padma Shri award recipients (2010–2019)
 List of Sahitya Akademi Award winners for Dogri

References 

Living people
Indian writers
Indian dramatists and playwrights
Recipients of the Padma Shri in literature & education
Recipients of the Sangeet Natak Akademi Award
Recipients of the Sahitya Akademi Award
People from Jammu and Kashmir
People from Jammu
1931 births
University of Jammu alumni
Recipients of the Sahitya Akademi Prize for Translation